Payback is a 2012 documentary film from Jennifer Baichwal based on Margaret Atwood's Payback: Debt and the Shadow Side of Wealth, which investigates the concept of debt in societies across the world (and not only on a monetary level).

As a Canadian, Baichwal was quite familiar with Atwood's reputation:

A number of prominent intellectuals provide commentary, including economist and writer Raj Patel, ecologist William E. Rees, historian of religions Karen Armstrong, and former UN High Commissioner for Human Rights Louise Arbour.

The film was produced by Ravida Din for the National Film Board of Canada. It premiered at the 2012 Sundance Film Festival. Payback is distributed by Zeitgeist Films, which also distributed Baichwal's previous works Act of God and Manufactured Landscapes. The film is being distributed in Canada by Mongrel Media, beginning March 2012.

See also
Margaret Atwood: Once in August, a 1984 National Film Board documentary about Atwood.

References

External links 
 
 
 Q&A with Baichwal in Salt Lake Tribune
 Scott, A. O., "Why the World’s Debt Is About More Than Money", New York Times review. "[T]ries to show how debt extends far beyond the domain of money", per Times.

2012 films
Documentary films about economics
2012 documentary films
Canadian documentary films
National Film Board of Canada documentaries
Films based on works by Margaret Atwood
Works about debt
Films directed by Jennifer Baichwal
Massey Lectures
Films based on non-fiction books
2010s Canadian films